Khvodkavand (also Romanized as Khvodkāvand) is a village in Bala Taleqan Rural District, in the Central District of Taleqan County, Alborz Province, Iran. At the 2006 census, its population was 424, in 121 families.

References 

Populated places in Taleqan County